Chai, full title in Thai Somdet Chaofa Chai  or King Sanpet VI, was a king of Ayutthaya, reigning for 1 day in August 1656.

Reign and Overthrow
Upon King Prasat Thong’s death in 1656, Chaofa Chai, his eldest son, succeeded his father as King Sanpet VI.

However, it was a Thai tradition gave brothers a higher priority over sons in succession. Prince Si Suthammaracha, Chaofa Chai's uncle, plotted with his nephew, Prince Narai, to bring Sanpet VI down. After nine months of ascension, Sanpet VI was executed following a coup. Narai and his uncle marched into the palace, and Si Suthammaracha crowned himself king. Si Suthammaracha appointed Narai as the Uparaja, or the Front Palace.

Ancestry

References

Kings of Ayutthaya
Prasat Thong dynasty
17th-century monarchs in Asia
1656 deaths
Executed Thai monarchs
Thai male Chao Fa 
Princes of Ayutthaya